Louis III of Châtillon, Comte de Dunois (died 15 July 1391) was the son of Guy II of Blois-Châtillon and Marie of Namur.

On 29 May 1386, in Bourges, he married Marie, Duchess of Auvergne, daughter of John, Duke of Berry. However, they had no children, and his death left his father without heirs, causing him to sell Blois to Louis of Valois, Duke of Orléans.

External links
 Counts of Blois

1391 deaths
Counts of France
Louis III
Year of birth unknown